The 1952 NBA playoffs was the postseason tournament of the National Basketball Association's 1951–52 season. The tournament concluded with the Western Conference champion Minneapolis Lakers defeating the Eastern Conference champion New York Knicks 4 games to 3 in the NBA Finals.

For the first time in NBA history, all teams that made the playoffs the year before meet again, but this time with different outcomes. This would happen again in 1957, in 1966, and then 1973 before a few more teams add to the playoffs in 1975, 1977 and 1984.

The first NBA dynasty, the Lakers, won their third NBA title in the last 4 years and what would become their first of 3 straight titles.

Bracket

Division Semifinals

Eastern Division Semifinals

(1) Syracuse Nationals vs. (4) Philadelphia Warriors

This was the third playoff meeting between these two teams, with the 76ers/Nationals winning the first two meetings.

(2) Boston Celtics vs. (3) New York Knicks

This was the second playoff meeting between these two teams, with the Knicks winning the first two meetings.

Western Division Semifinals

(1) Rochester Royals vs. (4) Fort Wayne Pistons

This was the third playoff meeting between these two teams, with both teams splitting the first two meetings.

(2) Minneapolis Lakers vs. (3) Indianapolis Olympians

This was the second playoff meeting between these two teams, with the Lakers winning the first meeting.

Division Finals

Eastern Division Finals

(1) Syracuse Nationals vs. (3) New York Knicks

This was the third playoff meeting between these two teams, with both teams splitting the first two meetings.

Western Division Finals

(1) Rochester Royals vs. (2) Minneapolis Lakers

This was the third playoff meeting between these two teams, with both teams splitting the first two meetings.

NBA Finals: (W2) Minneapolis Lakers vs. (E3) New York Knicks

This was the first playoff meeting between these two teams.

References

External links
Basketball-Reference.com's 1952 NBA Playoffs page

National Basketball Association playoffs
Playoffs

fi:NBA-kausi 1951–1952#Pudotuspelit